Wilson Aparecido Xavier Júnior (born 15 March 1984), commonly known as Juninho, is a Brazilian footballer who plays as a midfielder for Ihan.

Biography
Born in Arapongas, Paraná, Juninho started his career at Londrina Junior Team, the youth team of Londrina (they later became two separate entities).  He played once in the national cup in 2004. He was then loaned to Serie A team Chievo but played for its youth team. As Italy prevented signing non-EU players, he only trialled with the club and never signed for them officially.

Domžale
In 2004 he was loaned to Domžale from Londrina Junior Team along with Jhonnes. Later, teammate Lucas also joined him. Juninho remained at the city of Domžale for  seasons. His contract with Londrina Junior Team was also renewed in January 2007, as he signed a new five-year contract. He left the club on 2 December 2008.

Figueirense
On 23 December 2008, Figueirense announced the signing of the player on a one-year contract. His contract with Figueirense was terminated on 19 May 2009, after he played a few games in Campeonato Catarinense. He did not play any match in the 2009 Campeonato Brasileiro Série B.

Return to Domžale
On 31 August 2009 he returned to Slovenia in a -year deal. The deal with Domžale was renewed on 1 December 2010, until 31 May 2013.

Baku
At the beginning of the 2011–12 season, after already playing one match with Domžale in the league, Juninho signed with FC Baku.

Second return to Domžale
In February 2015, Juninho returned to Domžale, signing a contract till the end of the 2016–17 season.

Club career statistics

Personal life
Juninho is the cousin of fellow footballer Ademar.

Honours
Domžale
 Slovenian PrvaLiga (2): 2006–07, 2007–08
 Slovenian Cup (2): 2010–11, 2016–17
 Slovenian Supercup (2): 2007, 2011

Baku
 Azerbaijan Cup (1): 2011–12

References

External links
 PrvaLiga profile 
 

1984 births
Living people
People from Arapongas
Brazilian footballers
Association football midfielders
Londrina Esporte Clube players
Figueirense FC players
NK Domžale players
Slovenian PrvaLiga players
Brazilian expatriate footballers
Expatriate footballers in Italy
Brazilian expatriate sportspeople in Italy
Expatriate footballers in Slovenia
Brazilian expatriate sportspeople in Slovenia
FC Baku players
Expatriate footballers in Azerbaijan
Brazilian expatriate sportspeople in Azerbaijan
Expatriate footballers in Austria
Brazilian expatriate sportspeople in Austria
Sportspeople from Paraná (state)